Enzo Artoni and Daniel Melo won in the final 6–3, 1–6, 7–6(7–5) against Gastón Etlis and Brent Haygarth.

Seeds

  Lucas Arnold /  Jaime Oncins (first round)
  Gastón Etlis /  Brent Haygarth (final)
  Guillermo Cañas /  Martín García (quarterfinals)
  Tim Crichton /  Jason Weir-Smith (first round)

Draw

References
 2001 Brasil Open Men's Doubles Draw

Doubles
Men's Doubles